Girolamo da Treviso (1508 – September 10, 1544), also known as Girolamo di Tommaso da Treviso the Younger and Girolamo Trevigi, was an Italian Renaissance sculptor and painter in Henry VIII's court in England.

Biography
Born in Treviso, to a Tommaso. The identity of Girolamo da Treviso the Elder, remains unclear.

He was likely not a pupil of Pier Maria Pennacchi, as supposed in the 19th century. 
 
Stylistically, Girolamo is associated with Giorgionismo and the continuation of  Giorgione's style, and, while working in Bologna during the 1520s, the influence of Raphael's St. Cecilia. Besides working in Bologna, which included sculptural decoration on the portal of San Petronio and grisaille paintings inside, he also worked in Genoa, Faenza, Trent, and at the Palazzo del Te in Mantua. Giorgio Vasari, in his Lives of the Most Excellent Painters, Sculptors, and Architects, writes that Girolamo traveled to England to work as a military engineer for Henry VIII. He also worked as a painter there, A Protestant Allegory in the Royal Collection shows the Pope on the ground being pelted with large stones by various figures.  Girolamo was working as an engineer for Henry when killed by a cannon shot during the Siege of Boulogne in 1544.

Gallery

See also
Artists of the Tudor court
List of The Tudors episodes

Notes

References

Primary Sources

The Project Gutenberg EBook of Lives of the Most Eminent Painters Sculptors and Architects, by Giorgio Vasari

Secondary Sources

External links

Two works by Girolamo da Treviso at the National Gallery, London

1508 births
1544 deaths
People from Treviso
16th-century Italian painters
16th-century Italian sculptors
Italian male painters
Renaissance painters